Lucio Fernando España López (29 October 1971 — 2 June 2005) was a Colombian footballer. The defender helped Atlético Nacional win the national league title in 1999, and also played for Atlético Bucaramanga, Real Cartagena, Atlético Junior, and Deportivo Pereira.

Career
España played well for Cortuluá during 1995, but a move to Deportivo Cali fell through after he failed a physical before the 1996–97 season began.

In 1999, España joined Atlético Nacional from Atlético Bucaramanga.

Personal
On 2 June 2005, España was shot by two thieves while picking up a nephew from a football field in Jamundí. A number of Colombian footballers have been shot the last 20 years, the most notable being Andrés Escobar. Other firearms victims include former Atlético Nacional players Albeiro Usuriaga, who was killed in Cali one year earlier, Omar Cañas, Martin Zapata, Elson Becerra, Jairo Zulbarán and Felipe Pérez Urrea.

References

1971 births
2005 deaths
Colombian footballers
Atlético Nacional footballers
Atlético Bucaramanga footballers
Atlético Junior footballers
Cortuluá footballers
Deportes Quindío footballers
Deportivo Pereira footballers
Categoría Primera A players
Colombian murder victims
Deaths by firearm in Colombia
Male murder victims
People murdered in Colombia
Association football defenders
Sportspeople from Valle del Cauca Department